Liu Zhuang (October 24, 1932 – June 30, 2011) was a Chinese composer. She was born in Shanghai, and studied piano with her father as a child in Hongzhou. She graduated in composition from the Shanghai Conservatory, where she studied with Ding Shande, Sang Tong and Den Erjing. She continued her studies with Guroff in Russia.

After completing her studies, Liu taught music at the Shanghai Conservatory and then moved to Beijing, where she taught at the Central Conservatory of Music. She also served as composer for the Central Philharmonic Society of Beijing. From 1989 to 2003, she was scholar-in-residence and music teacher at Syracuse University.  She appeared as herself in the 1988 documentary A Tale of the Wind.

Works
Selected works include:
The Yellow River Concerto
Living Waters, choral
Wind Through Pines, for flute, cello & prepared piano
Three Chinese Songs
Yimeng Mountain Ditty

Her works have been recorded and issued on CD, including:
American Masters for the 21st Century (January 1, 2004) Innova

Her music has been used on film soundtracks, including:
Une Histoire De Vent

References

1932 births
2011 deaths
Chinese music educators
Chinese women classical composers
Musicians from Shanghai
Educators from Shanghai
Chinese classical composers
Women music educators
Shanghai Conservatory of Music alumni
Academic staff of Shanghai Conservatory of Music
Academic staff of the Central Conservatory of Music
Syracuse University faculty
20th-century women composers
20th-century classical composers